Paramount Chief Abu Mbawa Kongobah is a Sierra Leonean politician. He is a member of the Pan-African Parliament and the Paramount Chief from Kono District. In the Pan-African Parliament, he is in the Committee on Rural Economy, Agriculture, Natural Resources, and Environment.

References

Year of birth missing (living people)
Living people
Members of the Parliament of Sierra Leone
Members of the Pan-African Parliament from Sierra Leone
People from Kono District